The 2007–2008 Cyclo-cross Superprestige events and season-long competition takes place between 14 October 2007 and 16 February 2008. Eight events are organised.

Results

Men

See also
 2007–2008 UCI Cyclo-cross World Cup
 2007–2008 Cyclo-cross Gazet van Antwerpen

External links
 Cyclo-cross.info  
 Official website

S
S
Cyclo-cross Superprestige